The Australian Film Institute Award for Best Screenplay, Original or Adapted is an award in the annual Australian Film Institute Awards. It has been awarded annually since 1967. In 2011, it was changed to the AACTA Awards.

While the category of Best Screenplay is given out in two different forms (Original or Adapted), some years involved the AACTA Awards handing out both types of screenplays in the same ceremony. The winners and nominees for those few years are listed below.

Winners and nominees

External links
AACTA Awards
AACTA Award for Best Adapted Screenplay
AACTA Award for Best Original Screenplay

References

AACTA Award winners